Polyspilota griffinii, common name Griffin mantis, is a species of praying mantis native to Cameroon that grows to about 5 inches in length.

See also
List of mantis genera and species

References

Mantidae
Insects of Cameroon
Insects described in 1911